The following are lists of films which have been placed number one at the weekend box office in a region.



Lists

Click "Region" to sort by region.

See also
 Box office
 List of highest-grossing films
 Lists of highest-grossing films
 List of films with the most weekends at number one

Lists of film lists